Drunk walking describes people intoxicated by alcohol walking in public spaces. Whereas there are long standing social stigmas and laws against drunk driving, only more recently have the personal and social dangers of drunk walking become apparent; pretending being drunk could become however a misdemeanor in Iowa. Pedestrians under the influence of alcohol may be less likely to use crosswalks and more likely to cross against the traffic lights.  Alcohol use is connected to more serious injuries with longer hospital stays if a pedestrian is hit by a vehicle.

Statistics

US 
U.S. department of transportation data from 2009 reported that 4,092 pedestrians were killed and 13.6% of them were under the influence of alcohol, drugs or medication. Pedestrian injury accounts for 11% of all road user fatalities.  In the United States in 2006 there were 4,784 fatalities and 61,000 injuries from pedestrian injury.  In 2007 there were 4,654 fatalities and 70,000 injuries.

Canada
In Canada, injury is the prominent source of death for those under 45 years of age and the fourth most collective reason of death for all ages.  Traumatic pedestrian injury results in nearly 4,000 hospitalisations in Canada yearly.  The outcome of these injuries come from the interaction of environmental factors changing.

Australia
In 2011, the Pedestrian Council of Australia launched a campaign called "Never Let a Mate Walk Home Drunk", in an effort to curb the high number of pedestrians killed on Australian roads. 20% of pedestrians killed on Australian roads have a BAC exceeding 0.05%, and 30% of those killed or seriously injured have a BAC over 0.08%.

Between 2003–2006 in Adelaide there were 40 pedestrian fatalities, and of those 12 were found to be drunk. In three or four of these cases it was found that they were either lying or sitting on the ground at night. In Australia, men are the biggest culprits with a study done between 1998–2002 with 38% of fatal incidents to pedestrians happening to males ages 15–54, and out of those 78% were over the legal limit to drive.

See also 
Alcohol intoxication
Public intoxication
Drunk driving

References 

Alcohol abuse
Drinking culture
Health risk